FINCA International is a non-profit, microfinance organization, founded by John Hatch in 1984.  FINCA is the innovator of the village banking methodology in microcredit and is widely regarded as one of the pioneers of modern-day microfinance. With its headquarters in Washington, D.C., FINCA is considered to be one of the most influential microfinance organizations in the world. The name FINCA is an acronym for Foundation for International Community Assistance.

Countries where FINCA operates
 Latin America and the Caribbean: Ecuador (founded in 1994), Guatemala (founded in 1998), Haiti (founded in 1989), Honduras (founded in 1989), Nicaragua (founded in 1992)
 Newly independent states (Eurasia): Armenia (founded in 1999), Azerbaijan (founded in 1998), Georgia (founded in 1998), Kosovo (founded in 2000), Kyrgyzstan (founded in 1995), Tajikistan (founded in 2003)
 Africa: DR Congo (founded in 2003), Malawi (founded in 1994), Tanzania (founded in 1998), Uganda (founded in 1992), Zambia (founded in 2001), Nigeria (founded in 2014)
 Middle East and South Asia: Afghanistan (founded in 2003), Jordan (founded in 2007), Pakistan (founded in 2013)

See also

 FINCA Afghanistan
 FINCA Uganda Limited
 John Hatch
 Village banking
 Microcredit
 Microfinance
 Opportunity International

References

External links
 
 Natalie Portman's video interview regarding FINCA on ABC News' This Week with George Stephanopoulos, April 29, 2007 
 Natalie Portman's video interview regarding FINCA on ABC's The View, May 1, 2007
 Natalie Portman's interview regarding her involvement with FINCA and The Village Banking Campaign on MSNBC, August 18, 2009

Microfinance organizations
Organizations established in 1984
Non-profit organizations based in Washington, D.C.
International non-profit organizations
Microfinance banks